Limnonectes khammonensis is a species of frog in the family Dicroglossidae. Endemic to Laos and Vietnam, its status is insufficiently known.

References

khammonensis
Amphibians of Laos
Amphibians of Vietnam
Taxonomy articles created by Polbot
Amphibians described in 1929